is a Japanese surname. Alternative transliterations include Otsuka and Ohtsuka. Notable people with the surname include:

 Ai Otsuka (大塚 愛, born 1982), Japanese pop singer from the Kansai region
 Akinori Otsuka (大塚 晶則, born 1972), Japanese baseball player
 Akio Ōtsuka (大塚 明夫, born 1959), Japanese voice actor, son of Chikao Ohtsuka
 Chihiro Otsuka (大塚 ちひろ, born 1986), Japanese actress
 Chikao Ohtsuka (大塚 周夫, 1929–2015), Japanese voice actor, father of Akio Ōtsuka
 Gen Ōtsuka (大束 元, 1912–1992), Japanese photographer
 Hirofumi Otsuka (大塚 博文, born 1947), Japanese speed skater
 Hironori Ōtsuka (大塚 博紀, 1892–1982), creator and first Grand Master of the Japanese karate style Wado-ryu
 Hōchū Ōtsuka (大塚 芳忠, born 1954), Japanese voice actor
 James Otsuka (1921–1984), war tax resister
 Julie Otsuka (born 1962), Japanese American author
 Michael Otsuka (born 1964), London-based academian
 Miyako Ōtsuka (大塚 宮子, born 1953), Japanese basketball player
 Miyu Otsuka (大塚 美優, born 1994), Japanese swimmer
 Motoyuki "Morrie" Ōtsuka (大塚 基之, born 1964), Japanese singer-songwriter
Noyuri Otsuka (1924–2019), Japanese Christian scholar and researcher
 Tadashi Ohtsuka (大束 忠司, born 1978), Japanese badminton player
 Tarō Ōtsuka (大塚 太郎, 1868–?), Japanese garden designer: see T. R. Otsuka
 T. R. Otsuka (1868–?), Japanese garden designer
, Japanese volleyball player
 Takeo Otsuka (大塚 武生, born 1966), Japanese professional wrestler also known as Men's Teioh or Terry Boy
 Yasuo Ōtsuka (大塚 康生, born 1931), animator 
 Yuto Otsuka (大塚 裕土, born 1987), Japanese basketball player
 Sae Ōtsuka (大塚 紗英, born 1995), Japanese voice actor, singer

Japanese-language surnames